"Flight of the Phoenix" is the fifty-fourth episode of the television comedy series Arrested Development and the first episode of the fourth season. The episode was originally released on May 26, 2013 and distributed by Netflix. It was written by the show's creator and executive producer Mitchell Hurwitz, and directed by Hurwitz and Troy Miller. The episode was also released on DVD in the United States and Canada on December 16, 2014 along with the rest of the fourth season.

Plot
Thirty years ago, in retaliation for their maid taking a day off for Cinco de Mayo, Lucille (Kristen Wiig) and George Bluth, Sr. (Seth Rogen) started "Cinco de Cuatro", to take place on the eve of Cinco de Mayo in order to deplete stocks used for celebrations. In the present day, Michael Bluth (Jason Bateman) finds himself at his lowest point at Cinco de Cuatro. Drunk and heavily indebted to "Lucille 2" Austero (Liza Minnelli), who is appearing at the event to promote her political campaign for a congressional seat, he offers to have sex with her in a desperate bid to have his debt remitted. Unsuccessful, Michael returns to the model home in Sudden Valley, where he runs into his brother, Gob (Will Arnett), and reacts with shock when he sees that Gob had sex with a person whose identity is deliberately not revealed to the viewer. Gob panics, overpowers Michael, and forces him to take a "forget-me-now" (a rohypnol pill).

Five years ago, after the disastrous boat party, Michael returns to the family following his mother's arrest. But when he learns that his parents had received economic stimulus money, and once again embezzled it instead of investing it in the Bluth company, Michael attempts to finally disassociate himself from the family by selling his stock to Lucille 2. He also decides to build houses at Sudden Valley under his own company, Michael B., despite the lack of roads leading into the complex. Having no immediate buyers, Michael again approaches Lucille 2 to secure a loan of $700,000 until residents move in. But due to the 2007 housing bubble, all chances of getting any houses sold evaporate and Michael winds up living in a ghost town. When the mailman, Pete, his only link to the outside world, dies from a heart attack one morning, Michael moves in with his son, George Michael (Michael Cera), at UC Irvine.

George Michael is occupied with the development of "Fakeblock", a piece of privacy-enforcing and anti-piracy software, along with his roommate, Paul "P-Hound" Huan (Richard Jin Namkung). Trying to carve his own path in the world, he is uncomfortable with the presence of his father, and his loss of privacy, and he tries repeatedly to imply to Michael that he should move out. Mistakenly, Michael thinks that George Michael is trying to get rid of P-Hound, and arranges a four-person silent vote including George Michael, a visiting Maeby (Alia Shawkat), P-Hound, and himself to decide who must leave the dorm. But Michael is shocked to discover that he has been unanimously voted out (as he voted for himself as part of a failed ploy).

Crushed by his son's rejection, Michael tries to take solace in being featured in an issue of Altitude, Outwest Airlines' in-flight magazine. The staff at the counter (Adam DeVine, Blake Anderson and Anders Holm of Workaholics) refuse to give him a copy of the magazine, which is reserved for passengers. Michael then must purchase a plane ticket; when told that the cheapest destination is Pittsburgh, he instead opts for the second cheapest, Phoenix, Arizona. Michael finally reads the article aboard the plane and, much to his dismay, discovers that it portrays him as a failed businessman.

On the next Arrested Development...
Michael steps out off the cool airport into the hot Phoenix sun, and hails a cab, but he ends up burning his hand on the handle. Later, desperately needing a place to stay, he returns to Orange Country to squat in his parents' penthouse apartment at Balboa Towers, however, he finds the apartment completely trashed. Theorizing on who is behind the destruction, he first guesses Buster, then Gob. As he is attacked by an ostrich, the narrator confirms that it was Lindsay.

Reception

Critical reception
IGN gave the episode a 7.8, saying that while it was nice to see the characters again after this amount of time, the episode, particularly the dorm storyline, felt overly long and lost steam toward the end of the episode. The Guardians Hadley Freeman called the episode "a rather depressing kick-off", referring to Michael Bluth's desolate state throughout the episode, but noticed that it was "extraordinary how much Hurwitz packs into each 30 minute episode." Noel Murray of The A.V. Club called the dorm vote sequence "the funniest in the whole of Arrested Development to date", and opined that the relaunched show "is a sitcom that’s still pretty much clicking."

Accolades
For the 65th Primetime Creative Arts Emmy Awards, "Flight of the Phoenix" was honored with two Primetime Emmy Award nominations for Outstanding Single-Camera Picture Editing for a Comedy Series and Outstanding Music Composition for a Series. Additionally, for the 65th Primetime Emmy Awards, Jason Bateman was nominated for Outstanding Lead Actor in a Comedy Series for this episode.

References

Arrested Development episodes
2013 American television episodes